Dennis Olsson (born 3 October 1994) is a Swedish footballer who plays for GIF Sundsvall as a left back.

Career
On 25 March 2019, Olsson joined Belarusian Premier League side Torpedo-BelAZ Zhodino after his contract had expired at GIF Sundsvall.

References

External links
 
  
 

1994 births
Living people
People from Sundsvall
Sportspeople from Västernorrland County
Swedish footballers
Sweden youth international footballers
Swedish expatriate footballers
Expatriate footballers in Belarus
Allsvenskan players
Association football defenders
FC Torpedo-BelAZ Zhodino players
GIF Sundsvall players